Manx ( or , pronounced  or ), also known as Manx Gaelic, is a Gaelic language of the insular Celtic branch of the Celtic language family, itself a branch of the Indo-European language family. Manx is the historical language of the Manx people.

Although only few children native to the Isle of Man speak Manx as a first language, there has been a steady increase in the number of speakers since the death of Ned Maddrell in 1974. He was considered to be the last speaker to grow up in a Manx-speaking community environment. Despite this, the language has never fallen completely out of use, with a minority having some knowledge of it as a heritage language, and it is still an important part of the island's culture and cultural heritage.

Manx is often cited as a good example of language revival efforts; in 2015, around 1,800 people had varying levels of second-language conversational ability. Since the late 20th century, Manx has become more visible on the island, with increased signage, radio broadcasts and a Manx-medium primary school. The revival of Manx has been made easier because the language was well recorded, e.g. the Bible and the Book of Common Prayer had been translated into Manx, and audio recordings had been made of native speakers.

Names

In Manx
The endonym of the language is /, which shares the same etymology as the word "Gaelic", as do the endonyms of its sister languages Irish (and ) and Scottish Gaelic. Manx frequently uses the forms / (with definite article), as do Irish and Scottish Gaelic.

To distinguish it from the two other forms of Gaelic, the phrases  "Gaelic of Mann" and  "Manx Gaelic" are also used. In addition, the nickname  "the mother tongue, lit. the mother's tongue" is occasionally used.

In English
The language is usually referred to in English as "Manx". The term "Manx Gaelic" is often used, for example when discussing the relationship between the three Goidelic languages (Irish, Scottish Gaelic, and Manx) or to avoid confusion with Manx English, the form of English spoken on the island. A feature of Manx English deriving from Gaelic is the use of the definite article, e.g. "the Manx", "the Gaelic", in ways not generally seen in standard English.

The word "Manx", often spelled historically as "Manks" particularly by natives of the island,  means "Mannish" and originates from Old Norse . The Isle of Man is named after the Irish god Manannán mac Lir, thus Ellan Vannin ("Mannanán's Island", Irish:  "Mannanán's Island").

History

Manx is a Goidelic language, closely related to Irish and Scottish Gaelic. On the whole it is partially mutually intelligible with these, and native speakers of one find it easy to gain passive, and even spoken, competency in the other two.

It has been suggested that a little-documented Brythonic language (i.e. related to modern Welsh, Cornish and Breton) may have been spoken on the Isle of Man before the arrival of Christian missionaries from Ireland in the early Middle Ages. However, there is little surviving evidence about the language spoken on the island at that time.

The basis of the modern Manx language is Primitive Irish (like modern Irish and Scottish Gaelic). The Island either lends its name to or takes its name from Manannán, the Brythonic and Gaelic sea god who is said in myth to have once ruled the island. Primitive Irish is first attested in Ogham inscriptions from the 4th century AD. These writings have been found throughout Ireland and the west coast of Great Britain. Primitive Irish transitioned into Old Irish through the 5th century. Old Irish, dating from the 6th century, used the Latin script and is attested primarily in marginalia to Latin manuscripts, but there are no extant examples from the Isle of Man.

Latin was used for ecclesiastical records from the establishment of Christianity in the Isle of Man in the 5th century AD. Many lexical items concerning religion, writing and record keeping entered Manx at this time.

The Isle of Man was conquered by Norse Vikings in the 9th century. Although there is some evidence in the form of runic inscriptions that Norse was used by some of these settlers, the Vikings who settled around the Irish Sea and West Coast of Scotland soon became Gaelic speaking Norse-Gaels. During the 9th century AD, the Gaelic of the inhabitants of the Isle of Man, like those Scotland and the North of Ireland, may have been significantly influenced by Norse speakers. While Norse had very little impact on the Manx language overall, a small number of  modern place names on the Isle Of Man are Norse in origin, e.g. Laxey (Laksaa) and Ramsey (Rhumsaa). Other Norse legacies in Manx include loanwords and personal names.

By the 10th century, it is supposed that Middle Irish had emerged and was spoken throughout Ireland, Scotland and the Isle of Man.

The island came under Scottish rule in 1266, and alternated between Scottish and English rule until finally becoming the feudal possession of the Stanley family in 1405. It is likely that up until this point, except for scholarly knowledge of Latin and courtly use of Anglo-Norman, that Manx was the only language spoken on the island. Since the establishment of the Stanleys on the Isle of Man, first Anglo-Norman and later the English language have been the chief external factors in the development of Manx, until the 20th century, when Manx speakers became able to access Irish and Scottish Gaelic media.

Manx had diverged considerably from the Gaelic languages of Scotland and Ireland between 1400 and 1900. The seventeenth century Plantation of Ulster, the decline of Irish in Leinster and extinction of Galloway Gaelic led to the geographic isolation of Manx from other dialects of Gaelic. The development of a separate orthography also led Manx to diverge from Irish and Scottish Gaelic.

In the 17th century, some university students left the Isle of Man to attend school in England. At the same time, teaching in English was required in schools founded by governor Isaac Barrow. Barrow also promoted the use of English in churches; he considered that it was a superior language for reading the Bible; however, because the majority of ministers were monolingual Manx speakers, his views had little practical impact.

Thomas Wilson began his tenure as Bishop of Mann in 1698 and was succeeded by Mark Hildesley. Both men held positive views of Manx; Wilson was the first person to publish a book in Manx, a translation of The Principles and Duties of Christianity (Coyrie Sodjey), and Hildesley successfully promoted the use of Manx as the language of instruction in schools. The New Testament was first published in Manx in 1767. In the late 18th century, nearly every school was teaching in English. This decline continued into the 19th century, as English gradually became the primary language spoken on the Isle of Man.

In 1848, J.G. Cumming wrote, "there are ... few persons (perhaps none of the young) who speak no English." Henry Jenner estimated in 1874 that about 30% of the population habitually spoke Manx (12,340 out of a population of 41,084). According to official census figures, 9.1% of the population claimed to speak Manx in 1901; in 1921 the percentage was only 1.1%. Since the language was used by so few people, it had low linguistic "prestige", and parents tended to not teach Manx to their children, thinking it would be useless to them compared with English.

Revival
Following the decline in the use of Manx during the nineteenth century,  (The Manx Language Society) was founded in 1899. By the middle of the twentieth century, only a few elderly native speakers remained (the last of them, Ned Maddrell, died on 27 December 1974), but by then a scholarly revival had begun and a few people had started teaching it in schools. The Manx Language Unit was formed in 1992, consisting of three members and headed by Manx Language Officer Brian Stowell, a language activist and fluent speaker, "which was put in charge of all aspects of Manx language teaching and accreditation in schools." This led to an increased interest in studying the Manx language and encouraged a renewed sense of ethnic identity. The revival of Manx has been aided by the recording work done in the twentieth century by researchers. Most notably, the Irish Folklore Commission was sent in with recording equipment in 1948 by Éamon de Valera. Also important in preserving the Manx language was work conducted by the late Brian Stowell, who is considered personally responsible for the current revival of the Manx language. The Manx Language Strategy was released in 2017, outlining a five-year plan for the language's continued revitalisation. Culture Vannin employs a Manx Language Development Officer (Manx: Yn Greinneyder) to encourage and facilitate the use of the language.

In 2009, UNESCO's Atlas of the World's Languages in Danger declared Manx an extinct language, despite the presence of hundreds of speakers on the Isle of Man. Since then, UNESCO's classification of the language has changed to "critically endangered".

In the 2011 census, 1,823 out of 80,398 Isle of Man residents, or 2.27% of the population, claimed to have knowledge of Manx, an increase of 134 people from the 2001 census. These individuals were spread roughly uniformly over the island: in Douglas 566 people professed an ability to speak, read or write Manx; 179 in Peel, 146 in Onchan, and 149 in Ramsey.

Number of speakers by year

Status

Manx is not officially recognised by any national or regional government, although its contribution to Manx culture and tradition is acknowledged by some governmental and non-governmental bodies. For example:

The Standing Orders of the House of Keys provide that: "The proceedings of the House shall be in English; but if a Member at any point pronounces a customary term or sentence in Manx Gaelic or any other language, the Speaker may call upon the Member for a translation." An example was at the sitting on 12 February 2019, when an MHK used the expression , stated to mean "nonsense".

Manx is used in the annual Tynwald ceremony and Manx words are used in official Tynwald publications.

For the purpose of strengthening its contribution to local culture and community, Manx is recognised under the European Charter for Regional or Minority Languages and in the framework of the British-Irish Council.

The Isle of Man comprised the one site for the Manx language in the Atlas Linguarum Europae, a project that compared dialects and languages across all countries in Europe.

Manx is taught as a second language at all of the island's primary and secondary schools. The lessons are optional and instruction is provided by the Department of Education's Manx Language Team which teach up to A Level standard.

The Bunscoill Ghaelgagh, a primary school at St John's, has 67 children, as of September 2016, who receive nearly all of their education through the medium of the language. Children who have attended the school have the opportunity to receive some of their secondary education through the language at Queen Elizabeth II High School in Peel.

Bilingual road, street, village and town boundary signs are common throughout the Isle of Man. All other road signs are in English only.

Business signage in Manx is gradually being introduced but is not mandated by law; however, the 1985 Tynwald Report on the use of Manx states that signage should be bilingual except where a Manx phrase is the norm.

Literature

Manx never had a large number of speakers, so it would not have been practical to mass produce written literature. However, a body of oral literature did exist. The "Fianna" tales and others like them are known, including the Manx ballad , commemorating Finn MacCumhail and Oisín. With the coming of Protestantism, Manx spoken tales slowly disappeared, while a tradition of carvals, Christian ballads, developed with religious sanction.

There is no record of literature written distinctively in Manx before the Reformation. By that time, any presumed literary link with Ireland and Scotland, such as through Irish-trained priests, had been lost. The first published literature in Manx was The Principles and Duties of Christianity (Coyrie Sodjey), translated by Bishop of Sodor and Man Thomas Wilson.

The Book of Common Prayer was translated by John Phillips, the Welsh-born Anglican Bishop of Sodor and Man from 1605 to 1633. The early Manx script has some similarities with orthographical systems found occasionally in Scotland and in Ireland for the transliteration of Gaelic, such as the Book of the Dean of Lismore, as well as some extensive texts based on English and Scottish English orthographical practices of the time. Little secular Manx literature has been preserved.

The New Testament was first published in 1767. "knowledge"), though it is also used to represent , (e.g. "John" (vocative),   "fish").

Other works produced in the 18th and 19th centuries include catechisms, hymn books and religious tracts. A translation of Paradise Lost was made in 1796.

A considerable amount of secular literature has been produced in the 20th and 21st centuries as part of the language revival. In 2006, the first full-length novel in Manx,  ("The Vampire Murders") was published by Brian Stowell, after being serialised in the press. There is an increasing amount of literature available in the language, and recent publications include Manx versions of the Gruffalo and Gruffalo's Child.

Antoine de Saint-Exupéry's The Little Prince was translated into Manx by Rob Teare in 2019.

Learning the language

Media

Two weekly programmes in Manx are available on medium wave on Manx Radio:  on Monday and Jamys Jeheiney on Friday. The  news in Manx is available online from Manx Radio, who have three other weekly programmes that use the language: Clare ny Gael; Shiaght Laa and  Moghrey Jedoonee. Several news readers on Manx Radio also use a good deal of incidental Manx.

The Isle of Man Examiner has a monthly bilingual column in Manx.

The first film to be made in Manx, 22-minute-long  "The Sheep Under the Snow", premiered in 1983 and was entered for the 5th Celtic Film and Television Festival in Cardiff in 1984. It was directed by Shorys Y Creayrie (George Broderick) for Foillan Films of Laxey, and is about the background to an early 18th-century folk song. In 2013, a short film, Solace in Wicca, was produced with financial assistance from Culture Vannin, CinemaNX and Isle of Man Film. A series of short cartoons about the life of Cú Chulainn which were produced by BBC Northern Ireland are available as are a series of cartoons on Manx mythology. Most significant is a 13-part DVD series Manx translation of the award-winning series Friends and Heroes.

The Manx Bible

The Bible was first produced in Manx by a group of Anglican clergymen on the island. The Gospel of Matthew was printed in 1748. In 1772 the Old Testament was printed, together with the Wisdom of Solomon and Ecclesiasticus (Sirach) from the Apocrypha.

 "The Holy Bible" of the Old and New Testaments was published as one book by the SPCK in 1775, effectively fixing the modern orthography of Manx, which has changed little since. Jenner claims that some bowdlerisation had occurred in the translation, e.g. the occupation of Rahab the prostitute is rendered as  "a hostess, female inn-keeper." The bicentenary was celebrated in 1975 and included a set of stamps from the Isle of Man Post Office.

Bishop Hildesley required that these Metrical Psalms were to be sung in churches.

The British and Foreign Bible Society (BFBS) published the  "New Testament" in 1810 and reprinted it in 1824. "The Holy Bible" of the Old Testament and New Testament (without the two books of the Apocrypha) was first printed as a whole in 1819.

Since 2014 the BFBS 1936 Manx Gospel of John has been available online on YouVersion and Bibles.org.

Church
Manx has not been used in Mass since the late 19th century, though  holds an annual Christmas service on the island.

Classification and dialects

Manx is one of the three daughter languages of Old Irish (via Middle Irish), the other two being Irish and Scottish Gaelic. It shares a number of developments in phonology, vocabulary and grammar with its sisters (in some cases only with certain dialects) and shows a number of unique changes. There are two attested historical dialects of Manx, Northern Manx and Southern Manx. A third dialect may have existed in-between, around Douglas.

Similarities and differences with Irish and Scottish Gaelic
Manx and Scottish Gaelic share the partial loss of phonemic palatalisation of labial consonants; while in Irish velarised consonants  contrast phonemically with palatalised . "to stand" (Irish ),  "religion" (Irish ),  "fainting" (Early Modern Irish , lit. in clouds), and  "on you (pl.)" (Irish ).

(Irish and Scottish Gaelic , Northern Irish , South Connacht Irish ; Lewis Gaelic ),  "bitter" (Scottish  , Irish  (Northern/Western) , (Southern) ),  "river" (Scottish  , Irish  ),  "hand" (Scottish  , Irish  (Northern) , (Western) , (Southern) ),  "summer" (Scottish  , Irish  (Northern) , (Western/Southern) ). Rare retentions of the older pronunciation of  include ,  "Dublin", Middle Irish Duibhlinn .

"winter"  (Irish ;) and  "mountains" .

Like Connacht and Ulster Irish (cf. Middle Irish  "mockery" and  "women" have become  and  respectively in Manx. The affrication of slender "" sounds is also common to Manx, Northern Irish, and Scottish Gaelic.

Irish ) and  "apparatus" (cf. Gaelic ), like Northern/Western Irish and Southern dialects Scottish Gaelic (e.g. Arran, Kintyre).

Another property Manx shares with Ulster Irish and some dialects of Scottish Gaelic is that  rather than  appears in unstressed syllables before  ( in Manx), e.g.  "straight"  (Irish ),  "to remember"  (Scottish Gaelic ).

Like Southern and Western Irish and Northern Scottish Gaelic, but unlike the geographically closer varieties of Ulster Irish and Arran and Kintyre Gaelic, Manx shows vowel lengthening or diphthongisation before the Old Irish fortis and lenis sonorants, e.g.

Another similarity with Southern Irish is the treatment of Middle Irish word-final unstressed  (- in Irish and Scottish Gaelic). In nouns (including verbal nouns), this became  in Manx, as it did in Southern Irish, e.g. "war" ,  "to praise"  (cf. In finite verb forms before full nouns (as opposed to pronouns)  became  in Manx, as in Southern Irish, e.g. "would praise" (cf. Irish  (Southern Irish) ).

Dialects

Linguistic analysis of the last few dozen native speakers reveals a number of dialectal differences between the North and the South of the island. Northern Manx was spoken from Maughold in the northeast to Peel on the west coast. Southern Manx was spoken in the sheading of Rushen. It is possible that written Manx represents a 'midlands' dialect of Douglas and surrounding areas.

In Southern Manx, older , and in some cases , became . In Northern Manx the same happened, but  sometimes remained  as well, e.g. "day" (cf. Old  is always  in both dialects, e.g. "young" (cf.

In Northern Manx, older  before  in the same syllable is diphthongised, while in Southern Manx it is lengthened but remains a monophthong, e.g. "head" (cf.

"wind" (cf.

This is known as pre-occlusion. These forms are generally pronounced without pre-occlusion in the North. This feature is also found in Cornish.

Southern Manx tended to lose word-initial  before , which was usually preserved in the North, e.g.

Phonology

Stress 
Stress generally falls on the first syllable of a word in Manx, but in many cases, stress is attracted to a long vowel in the second syllable. Examples include:
   "sprite"
   "busy"
   "royal"
   "advantage"

Consonants 
The consonant phoneme inventory of Manx:

The voiceless plosives are aspirated.

Manx has an optional process of lenition of plosives between vowels, where voiced plosives and voiceless fricatives become voiced fricatives and voiceless plosives become either voiced plosives or voiced fricatives. This process introduces the allophones . Examples include:

Voiceless plosive to voiced plosive:
  > :   "flag, rag"
  > :   "sin"
Voiceless plosive to voiced fricative:
  > :   "cup"
  > :   "boat"
  > :   "tooth"
Voiced plosive to voiced fricative:
  > :   "horse"
  > :   "face"
  > :   "prayer"
  >  > :   "stick"
  > :   "born"
Voiceless fricative to voiced fricative:
  >  or :   "married"
  > :   "stand"
  > :   "easy"
  >  > :   "beginning"
  > :   "live"
  >  > ∅:   "past"

Another optional process is pre-occlusion, the insertion of a very short plosive before a sonorant consonant. In Manx, this applies to stressed monosyllabic words. The inserted consonant is homorganic with the following sonorant, which means it has the same place of articulation. Long vowels are often shortened before pre-occluded sounds. Examples include:
  > :   >  "heavy"
  > :   >  "head"
  > :   >  "birds"
  > :   >  "ship"
  > :   >  "walking"

The trill  is realised as a one- or two-contact flap  at the beginning of syllable, and as a stronger trill  when preceded by another consonant in the same syllable. At the end of a syllable,  can be pronounced either as a strong trill  or, more frequently, as a weak fricative , which may vocalise to a nonsyllabic  or disappear altogether. This vocalisation may be due to the influence of Manx English, which is non-rhotic. Examples of the pronunciation of  include:
  "snare" 
  "bread" 
  "big"

Vowels
The vowel phoneme inventory of Manx:

This depends mainly on the 'broad' and 'slender' status of the neighbouring consonants:

Manx has a relatively large number of diphthongs, all of them falling:

Syntax and morphology

Syntax 

Like most Insular Celtic languages, Manx is a VSO language. However, most finite verbs are formed periphrastically, using an auxiliary verb in conjunction with the verbal noun. In this case, only the auxiliary verb precedes the subject, while the verbal noun comes after the subject. Particles like the negative  ("not") precede the inflected verb. Examples:

As in Irish (cf. Irish syntax#The forms meaning "to be"), there are two ways of expressing "to be" in Manx: with the substantive verb , and with the copula. The substantive verb is used when the predicate is an adjective, adverb, or prepositional phrase. Examples:

Where the predicate is a noun, it must be converted to a prepositional phrase headed by the preposition  ("in") + possessive pronoun (agreeing with the subject) in order for the substantive verb to be grammatical:

Otherwise, the copula is used when the predicate is a noun.

In questions and negative sentences, the present tense of the copula is :

Morphology

Initial consonant mutations 
Like all modern Celtic languages, Manx shows initial consonant mutations, which are processes by which the initial consonant of a word is altered according to its morphological and/or syntactic environment. Manx has two mutations: lenition and eclipsis, found on nouns and verbs in a variety of environments; adjectives can undergo lenition but not eclipsis. In the late spoken language of the 20th century the system was breaking down, with speakers frequently failing to use mutation in environments where it was called for, and occasionally using it in environments where it was not called for.

In the corpus of the late spoken language, there is also one example of the eclipsis (nasalisation) of : the sentence  ("I have found the lamb"), where  is pronounced . However, probably this was a mis-transcription; the verbal noun in this case is not  "get, fetch", but rather  "find".

Nouns 
Manx nouns display gender, number and sometimes case, for instance, for feminine  "foot".

Pronouns 
In addition to regular forms, personal pronouns also have emphatic versions.

Verbs 
Manx verbs generally form their finite forms by means of periphrasis: inflected forms of the auxiliary verbs  "to be" or  "to do" are combined with the verbal noun of the main verb. Only the future, conditional, preterite, and imperative can be formed directly by inflecting the main verb, but even in these tenses, the periphrastic formation is more common in Late Spoken Manx.

The fully inflected forms of the regular verb  "to throw" are as follows. In addition to the forms below, a past participle may be formed using :  "thrown".

1.^ First person singular, making the use of a following subject pronoun redundant

2.^ First person plural, making the use of a following subject pronoun redundant

3.^ Used with all other persons, meaning an accompanying subject must be stated, e.g.  "he will throw",  "they will throw"

Below is the conjugation of  "to grow".

There is a small number of irregular verbs, the most irregular of all being  "be".

Prepositions 
Like the other Insular Celtic languages, Manx has inflected prepositions, contractions of a preposition with a pronominal direct object, as the following common prepositions show. Note the sometimes identical form of the uninflected preposition and its third person singular masculine inflected form.

Numbers
Numbers are traditionally vigesimal in Manx, e.g.  "twenty",  "forty" ("two twenties"),  "sixty" ("three twenties").

Orthography
Manx orthography is based on Early Modern English, and to a lesser extent Welsh, developed by people who had an education in English (and Welsh until the 16th century). The result is an inconsistent and only partially phonemic spelling system, similar to English orthography, unlike that of Irish and Scottish Gaelic, which both use similar spelling systems derived from Classical Gaelic, the written language of the educated Gaelic elite of both Ireland and Scotland until the mid-19th century, which makes them very etymological. Both use only 18 letters to represent around 50 phonemes. While Manx uses 24 letters (the ISO basic Latin alphabet, excluding  and ), covering a similar range of phonemes, all three making use of many digraphs and trigraphs. T. F. O'Rahilly expressed the opinion that Manx spelling is inadequate, being neither traditional nor phonetic, and that if the traditional Gaelic orthography had been preserved the relationship between Manx, Irish and Scottish Gaelic would be obvious to readers at first sight.

There is no evidence of Gaelic type being used on the island.

Spelling to sound correspondences

Diacritics 
Manx uses only one diacritic, a cedilla, which is (optionally) used to differentiate between the two phonemes represented by :
  "lord", is pronounced with /t͡ʃ/ , as in the English "church"

Example
The following examples are taken from Broderick 1984–86, 1:178–79 and 1:350–53. The first example is from a speaker of Northern Manx, the second from Ned Maddrell, a speaker of Southern Manx.

Vocabulary
Manx vocabulary is predominantly of Goidelic origin, derived from Old Irish and has cognates in Irish and Scottish Gaelic. However, Manx itself, as well as the languages from which it is derived, borrowed words from other languages, especially Latin, Old Norse, French (particularly Anglo-Norman), and English (both Middle English and Modern English).

The following table shows a selection of nouns from the Swadesh list and indicates their pronunciations and etymologies.

See Celtic Swadesh lists for the complete list in all the Celtic languages.

Phrases

Loanwords

Loanwords are primarily Norse and English, with a smaller number coming from French. Some examples of Norse loanwords are  "garden" (from  "enclosure") and  "sea rock" (from ). Examples of French loanwords are  "danger" (from ) and  "advantage" (from ).

English loanwords were common in late (pre-revival) Manx, e.g. In more recent years, there has been a reaction against such borrowing, resulting in coinages for technical vocabulary. Despite this, calques exist in Manx, not necessarily obvious to its speakers. To fill gaps in recorded Manx vocabulary, revivalists have referred to modern Irish and Scottish Gaelic for words and inspiration.

Some religious terms come ultimately from Latin, Greek and Hebrew, e.g.  "holy" (from Latin ),  "church" (from Greek / "assembly") and  "abbot" (from Hebrew / "father"). These did not necessarily come directly into Manx, but via Old Irish. In more recent times,  has been borrowed from modern Hebrew. Many Irish and English loanwords also have a classical origin, e.g.  "television" (Irish ) and  "telephone". Foreign language words (usually via English) are used occasionally especially for ethnic food, e.g. chorizo and spaghetti.

Going in the other direction, Manx Gaelic has influenced Manx English (Anglo-Manx). Common words and phrases in Anglo-Manx originating in the language include tholtan "ruined farmhouse", quaaltagh "first-foot", keeill "(old) church", cammag, traa-dy-liooar  "time enough", and Tynwald (tinvaal), which is ultimately of Norse origin, but comes from Manx. It is suggested that the House of Keys takes its name from Kiare as Feed (four and twenty), which is the number of its sitting members.

Vocabulary comparison examples

Gaelic versions of the Lord's Prayer 
The Lord's Prayer has been translated into all of the Gaelic languages (and Old Irish). Although not direct, it is a good demonstration of the differences between their orthographies.

The standard version of the Lord's Prayer in Manx
Ayr ain t'ayns niau,
Casherick dy row dt'ennym.
Dy jig dty reeriaght.
Dt'aigney dy row jeant er y thalloo,
myr t'ayns niau.
Cur dooin nyn arran jiu as gagh laa,
as leih dooin nyn loghtyn,
myr ta shin leih dauesyn ta jannoo loghtyn nyn 'oi.
As ny leeid shin ayns miolagh,
agh livrey shin veih olk:
Son lhiats y reeriaght, as y phooar, as y ghloyr, son dy bragh as dy bragh.
Amen.

Manx version of 1713
Ayr Ain, t'ayns Niau;
Casherick dy rou dt'ennym;
Di jig dty Reereeaght;
Dt'aigney dy rou jeant er y Talloo myr ta ayns Niau;
Cur dooin nyn Arran jiu as gagh laa;
As leih dooin nyn Loghtyn, myr ta shin leih dauesyn ta janoo loghtyn ny noi shin;
As ny leeid shin ayns Miolagh;
Agh livrey shin veih olk;
Son liats y Reereeaght y Phooar as y Ghloyr, son dy bragh as dy bragh.
Amen

The prayer in Old Irish
A athair fil hi nimib,
Noemthar thainm.
Tost do flaithius.
Did do toil i talmain
amail ata in nim.
Tabair dun indiu ar sasad lathi.
Ocus log dun ar fiachu
amail logmaitne diar fhechemnaib.
Ocus nis lecea sind i n-amus n-dofulachtai.
Acht ron soer o cech ulc.
Amen ropfir.

The Prayer in modern Irish
Ár n-Athair, atá ar neamh:
go naofar d'ainm (alt. go naomhaíthear t'ainm).
Go dtaga(idh) do ríocht.
Go ndéantar do thoil ar an (d)talamh,
mar dhéantar ar neamh.
Ár n-arán laethúil tabhair dúinn inniu,
agus maith dúinn ár bhfiacha (alt. ár gcionta),
mar mhaithimid dár bhféichiúna féin (alt. mar a mhaithimíd dóibh a chiontaíonn inár n-aghaidh).
Agus ná lig sinn i gcathú (alt. i gcathaíbh),
ach saor sinn ó(n) olc.
Óir is leatsa an Ríocht agus an Chumhacht agus an Ghlóir, trí shaol na saol (alt. le saol na saol / go síoraí).
Áiméan.

The Prayer in Scottish Gaelic
Ar n-Athair a tha air nèamh,
Gu naomhaichear d' ainm.
Thigeadh do rìoghachd.
Dèanar do thoil air an talamh,
mar a nithear air nèamh.
Tabhair dhuinn an-diugh ar n-aran làitheil.
Agus maith dhuinn ar fiachan,
amhail a mhaitheas sinne dar luchd-fiach.
Agus na leig ann am buaireadh sinn;
ach saor sinn o olc:
oir is leatsa an rìoghachd, agus a' chumhachd, agus a' ghlòir, gu sìorraidh.
Amen.

Example text
Article 1 of the Universal Declaration of Human Rights in Manx: 
 
Article 1 of the Universal Declaration of Human Rights in English:
All human beings are born free and equal in dignity and rights. They are endowed with reason and conscience and should act towards one another in a spirit of brotherhood.

See also

 Cornish, another revived Celtic language.
 Irish language revival
 List of Celtic-language media
 List of revived languages
 List of television channels in Celtic languages

Notes

References

External links

 Percentage of resident population with a knowledge of Manx Gaelic 
 A bit of Manx Gaelic history
 Manx language, alphabet and pronunciation at Omniglot
 Information about the language
 isle-of-man.com language section
 Manx dictionaries via Multidict
 Online Manx Lessons with MP3 recordings
 Bilingual Bible in Manx and English by the Manx Language Project
 Manx: Bringing a language back from the dead
 Media article about the Manx revival
Manx free online course

 
Languages of the United Kingdom
Goidelic languages
Languages of Europe
Endangered Celtic languages
Language
Verb–subject–object languages
Language revival
Articles containing video clips